Jinnah Sports Stadium is a multi-purpose stadium in Islamabad, Pakistan. It is currently used mostly for football matches. The stadium has a capacity of 48,000 people and is the largest stadium in Pakistan.

Stadium 
This stadium was built in the 1970s. The stadium was renovated and used for the SAF Games in 2004. The playing field also has a running track around its perimeter allowing athletics use.

Tournaments hosted 
It has hosted the following sporting events:

 South Asian Games: 1989, 2004
 SAFF Championship: 2005 (semi-finals and final only)
 SAFF Women's Championship: 2014
 National Games of Pakistan: 2013
 Quaid-e-Azam Inter Provincial Youth Games: 2016, 2017
 Pakistan Premier League
 National Women Football Championship: 2005, 2006, 2007, 2008, 2009, 2010, 2011, 2012
 PFF League: 2010 (region round and Group B matches only), 2011
 All Pakistan Women Inter University Women Football Championship: 2011

See also

 List of stadiums in Pakistan
 List of stadiums by capacity

References

Sports venues in Pakistan
Athletics (track and field) venues in Pakistan
Football venues in Pakistan
Sport in Islamabad
Multi-purpose stadiums in Pakistan
1970 establishments in Pakistan
Sports venues completed in 1970
Memorials to Muhammad Ali Jinnah